The Men's individual pursuit event of the 2015 UCI Track Cycling World Championships was held on 21 February 2015.

Results

Qualifying
The qualifying was started at 17:10.

Finals
The finals were started at 20:55.

References

Men's individual pursuit
UCI Track Cycling World Championships – Men's individual pursuit